is a fictional character in the Soulcalibur series of video games. Created by Namco's Project Soul division, she first appeared in Soulcalibur II and its subsequent sequels, and later appeared in various merchandise and promotional material related to the series.

Cassandra has been heavily compared to her older sister Sophitia in terms of fighting style, though with acknowledgment that they were two different characters. Some sources have noted a fan following for the character.

Conception and design
Cassandra was originally supposed to replace Sophitia in SoulCalibur II; the series' creator and then-producer Hiroaki Yotoriyama said at the time in 2001: "We wanted to keep Sophitia's model but make it sufficiently different. I know Sophitia's fans might start to complain, but I think Cassandra should fit into the series." She was designed in mind to have greater determination than Sophitia, with greater physical abilities and skills.

To further the contrast between the characters, concept artists emphasized a dress and tights for her instead of traditional Greek attire. Though the rest of the team was initially skeptical of the tights, they warmly received the finished model and heavily praised the decision. Several of Cassandra's animations were done manually and blended with the motion capture-based animations done prior. As a result, the series' production manager noted that it gave some of her movements an uncomfortable appearance, and her proportions seem different from a human being's.

Appearances

Main series
Cassandra was the younger daughter and middle child of Achelous Alexander and his wife, Nike. She had an older sister, Sophitia, and a younger brother, Lucius, with whom she ran the family bakery in Athens. In Soul Edge, she was mentioned as having witnessed her sister's unconscious body being carried by female ninja Taki after the two successfully destroyed the cursed sword Soul Edge. Taki shared to her the information about a Soul Edge fragment that was lodged near her sister's heart, which Taki was unable to remove because it would kill her. Cassandra resolved never to tell anyone about this, even Sophitia herself. Three years later, she heard her sister had gone to another journey to destroy Soul Edge in Soulcalibur. Unlike her sister, whose skills originated from her weapons and the god Hephaestus, Cassandra was not as humble and could not hear him, relying instead on her own strength.

By the time of Soulcalibur II four years afterward, the 21-years-old Cassandra visited her sister's home to find that Sophitia's children Patroklos and Pyrrha were fighting for a fragment of Soul Edge that Sophitia's husband, Rothion, found, making Sophitia restless. She grabbed the fragment and went to the Eurydice Shrine, angrily cursing Hephaestus for endangering her sister. Cassandra stole Sophitia's holy Omega sword after seeing it reacting with the fragment and became determined to find and destroy Soul Edge in place of Sophitia.

Cassandra continued her quest to find Soul Edge in Soulcalibur III. She briefly returned to Greece to request Rothion to forge her new weapons after the Omega sword was broken following a skirmish at a corrupted city. He told her that Sophitia had gone to destroy Soul Edge on her own. She visited the city that she went earlier, where she met a man named Raphael who stole her fragment of Soul Edge. Before departing, he told that while she had the power to dispel evil, she was not as strong as the "Holy Stone". After hearing rumors in the city about a man with a large mass of crystal on his way to Ostrheinsburg Castle, Cassandra reasoned he carried the Holy Stone to fight some evil there, which she theorized was Soul Edge. Therefore, Cassandra went to the castle.

Cassandra did not make an appearance in Soulcalibur V, although she was mentioned in the official artbook of the game. According to the artbook, at the conclusion of Soulcalibur IV, she arrived at the Ostrheinsburg Castle and found out that Sophitia had pledged her service to Soul Edge to save Pyrrha, who spent too much time around Soul Edge and had to rely on the sword to survive. Sophitia rendered Cassandra unconscious with a single strike, wounding her greatly. When she awakened, she found that the entire castle was disintegrating into a realm called Astral Chaos. Now weakened, Cassandra found Sophitia's unconscious body in a room, but as she approached her, Cassandra was sucked to the Astral Chaos while the castle returned to normal, as she was too wounded to escape. Due to being stranded in the Astral Chaos, Cassandra became malfested, losing the memories of her own original identity, and keeping only her desire to save her sister.

In the new timeline of Soulcalibur VI, Cassandra ran the family bakery alongside Lucius while trying to cover for Sophitia's absence. She encountered her future self from the original timeline and found out her sister's tragic fate. As a result of this revelation, Cassandra set off on a journey to prevent Sophitia’s tragic future. After the wedding between Rothion and Sophitia, Cassandra was tasked with naming their first child.

Spin-Offs
Outside of the main series, Cassandra appeared in Soulcalibur: Broken Destinys Gauntlet storyline, a non-canon side story set during the events of Soulcalibur IV, which revolved around Cassandra and her ally Hilde, who was searching for ingredients to develop a potion to cure Hilde's father. To this end, she forced the protagonist to assist them, and later recruited another person, Dampierre, after Hilde was briefly kidnapped.

Cassandra also starred as one of the two main characters (and the one most prominently used for promotion) in the mobile card game Soulcalibur: Unbreakable Soul, alongside Edge Master. In it, Cassandra and Edge Master traveled to find the fragments of Soul Edge.

Other appearances
Besides the Soulcalibur series, Cassandra appeared in the video game Smash Court Tennis Pro Tournament 2 as an unlockable character. To explain the new features of Soulcalibur IV, Namco released an omake manga featuring Cassandra and Hilde; written in a humorous tone, Cassandra, representing a veteran of the series, "taught" Hilde about the game's features, while introducing the audience to aspects of Hilde's character. Cassandra appeared in The King of Fighters All Star in both her Soulcalibur VI design, and her "War Maiden" costume from Soulcalibur IV. She is the main protagonist of the story mode, "In the Hopeful Future", where she teamed up with Nakoruru from  Samurai Shodown to defeat Saiki, the main antagonist of The King of Fighters XIII.

Yujin released a four inch tall immobile figurine of Cassandra after the release of Soulcalibur II, based upon her artwork for the title as part of their "Namco Girls Series #1" line of gashapon figurines.  In 2006, Namco released a second Cassandra figurine as part of a Soulcalibur III set based upon her promotional artwork for the game. While not posable, the PVC figure came with three interchangeable weapons for it to hold; an alternate color version was later released in a secondary set.

Gameplay
When she debuted in Soulcalibur II, Cassandra placed in the middle between the more acrobatic but less damaging characters like Taki and the slower heavy-hitters like Heishiro Mitsurugi, feeling similar to the GameCube version's guest character Link. According to Electronic Gaming Monthlys guide to the game, she is "very similar to her sister, but not very beginner-friendly. Her attacks are powerful and fairly quick, but can be difficult to string together around. She has fewer juggle moves than Soph." Andrew Alfonso opined in GameSpy's guide that "because of her speed she's best played as an offensive-heavy character" and also noted her for having "also has one of the best overall moves in the game" (for her signature attack Deathfist). Her playstyle had been significantly changed by Soulcalibur IV. In Soulcalibur VI, Cassandra gains a brand new mode called “Divine Force”, which increases her attack power and allows her to perform special moves, but at the cost of her defense.

Reception
GameSpy's Christian Nutt noted Cassandra's similarity in Soulcalibur II to her sister in terms of fighting style, but added "thanks to some intelligent changes she feels like a whole new gal in many important respects". IGN commented on the similarity as well, but added that regardless she played "noticeably different".

PlayStation: The Official Magazine praised her appearance, featuring her in their 2003 "Girls of Summer" video game character "swimsuit" special, as well as on the issue's cover. GameDaily described her as a character that "grew into her own" since her appearance in Soulcalibur II, and later stated her appearance in Soulcalibur IV "looked better than ever" and described the character as "gorgeous". Edge praised the changes to her character in Soulcalibur IV, adding that they made her feel like "a fresh addition to the series". Kotaku's Michael McWhertor also praised her design in Soulcalibur IV in contrast to other females in the series, stating that Namco "thankfully [...] exercised a tad more restraint" and calling her the female character "you'll be picking when Mom comes over."

Cassandra was nominated for "Baddest Good Girl" in G4's Video Game Vixens award show in 2005, which was won by Final Fantasy X'''s Rikku. She placed as the 12th most popular Soulcalibur character in a poll on Namco Bandai's official English Facebook account of the series in 2015. A poll for the most erotic girl in the history of fighting games by Japanese web portal Goo placed her seventh in 2016.

IGN's Jesse Shedeen listed Cassandra as one of the series' top ten fighters at number eight in 2008, noting a large fan following and admiration for her "spunk." GamesRadar ranked her guest appearance in Smash Court Tennis Pro Tournament 2'' with Raphael Sorel, Heihachi Mishima and Ling Xiaoyu at #42 in their list of "awesome character cameos" in 2010. In 2015, WhatCulture included her in their list of 30 greatest female fighting game characters of all time.

References

Fantasy video game characters
Female characters in video games
Fictional Ottoman Greeks
Fictional Greek people in video games
Fictional characters from Athens
Fictional female martial artists
Fictional pagans
Fictional pankration practitioners
Fictional shield fighters
Fictional swordfighters in video games
Namco protagonists
Soulcalibur series characters
Video game characters introduced in 2002
Woman soldier and warrior characters in video games